Marston is a surname of English and Scottish origin. Notable people with the name include:

Surname
 Ann Marston (1938-1971), American archery champion, beauty pageant contestant, and rock band manager
 Edward Marston, pseudonym for English detective and historical fiction author Keith Miles
 George Marston (disambiguation)
 Gilman Marston (1811–1890), American politician and soldier from New Hampshire
 Hilary D. Marston, American physician-scientist and global health policy advisor
 Isaac Marston (1839–1891), American jurist
 Jeffery Allen Marston (1831–1911), British surgeon general, honorary surgeon to Queen Victoria and King Edward VII
 John Marston (playwright) (1576–1634), English poet and playwright
 John Marston, founder of Marston's Brewery in England in 1834
 John Westland Marston (1819–1890), English dramatist
 Levi Marston (1816–1904), American sea captain
 Marvin Marston, US Army officer, founder of the Alaska Territorial Guard, also called the Alaskan Scouts or Eskimo Scouts
 Philip Bourke Marston (1850–1887), English poet
 Robert Q. Marston (1923–1999), American medical scientist and academic official
 Ward Marston (born 1952), American audio transfer engineer, publisher of historical recordings
 William H. Marston (1835–1926), U.S. West Coast sea captain, early resident of Berkeley, California
 William Moulton Marston (1893–1947), American psychologist, creator of "Wonder Woman"

Given name
 Marston Bates (1906–1974), American zoologist
 Marston T. Bogert (1868–1954), American chemist
 Marston Clarke Buszard (1837–1921), English barrister and Member of Parliament
 Marston Conder (born 1955), New Zealand mathematician
 Marston Morse (1892–1977), American mathematician

Fictional characters
 John Marston, protagonist of the video game Red Dead Redemption
 Paul Marston, a main character in The Long Goodbye by Raymond Chandler
 Elliot Marston, the antagonist in Quigley Down Under
 Snake Marston (comics), a Marvel Comics character
 Anthony Marston, a victim in Agatha Christie's And Then There Were None

See also
 Marston (disambiguation)

English-language masculine given names